National Savings Bank (NSB) is a state-owned Savings Bank in Sri Lanka. It was incorporated in Ceylon by the National Savings Bank Act No. 30 of 1971 and was granted the status of the Licensed Specialised Bank in terms of the Banking Act No. 30 of 1988. NSB has 262 branches. It also carries out postal banking with the cooperation of 643 post offices and 3,412 sub-post offices of the Sri Lanka Post. The current Chairperson of the NSB is Mrs. Keasila Jayawardena

Past Chairmen
Since 1971, the following were Chairmen of the Bank (list incomplete):

 Harindranath George Dias
 M. J. Silva
 Muttusamy Sanmuganathan
 D.M Swaminathan
 Cyril Herath
 Upali Gunaratne
 S. R. Attygalle
 Pradeep Kariyawasam
 Aswin De Silva
 R.M.P. Rathnayake
 Jayaraja Chandrasekera

See also 

 List of banks

References

External links 
 

Banks of Sri Lanka
Banks established in 1971
State owned commercial corporations of Sri Lanka
Sri Lankan companies established in 1971
Banking in Sri Lanka